The 2020–21 Aston Villa W.F.C. season was the club's 25th season under their Aston Villa affiliation and the organisation's 47th overall season in existence. It was their debut season in the FA Women's Super League following promotion from the Championship, and as a fully professional team. Along with competing in the WSL, the club also contested two domestic cup competitions: the FA Cup and the League Cup.

Ahead of the campaign the team relocated from the Trevor Brown Memorial Ground to Bescot Stadium in Walsall.

On 25 January 2021, it was announced Marcus Bignot had been appointed interim manager with the current coaching team, including head coach Gemma Davies, all retaining their positions parallel with the appointment.

Current squad

Pre-season

FA Women's Super League

Results summary

Results by matchday

Results

League table

Women's FA Cup 

As a member of the top two tiers, Aston Villa will enter the FA Cup in the fourth round proper. Originally scheduled to take place on 31 January 2021, it was delayed due to COVID-19 restrictions.

FA Women's League Cup

Group stage

Knockout stage

Squad statistics

Appearances 

Starting appearances are listed first, followed by substitute appearances after the + symbol where applicable.

|}

Transfers

Transfers in

Transfers out

References

External links 
 AVFC Women official website

Aston Villa W.F.C. seasons
Aston Villa